is a Japanese seinen manga series written by Koushun Takami and illustrated by Masayuki Taguchi. It is based on Takami's novel of the same name, telling the story of a class of junior high school children who are forced to fight each other to the death. It was serialized by Akita Shoten in Young Champion from 2000 to 2005, and later combined into 15 tankobon volumes, which were released in English by Tokyopop from 2003 to 2006. In October 2007, a special edition of the manga began being released.

The manga follows the plot of the novel fairly closely, but expands on the backstory of each of the students. Much like the plots of the novel and film adaptation, the manga is noted for its intense and gory violence. The Tokyopop English adaptation of the manga makes several changes to the plot, such as claiming that "[The] Program" is a reality TV show and changing the time setting of the story by almost 10 years; both changes are contradicted in later volumes.

Characters

  is a Japanese student and one of the three main protagonists. Shuya, who is nicknamed "Shu", lives in the fictional town Shiroiwa in Kagawa Prefecture.
  is the main female protagonist of the series. She is one of the class of third-year students in Shuya's school. Noriko has a crush on Shuya, whom she admired for his music and song-writing.
  is a transfer student and the winner of a previous Program. At the very beginning he meets Shuya and Noriko and joins up with the two of them.
  is the main antagonist, who tries to win the Program (using a coin-toss to decide whether or not he plays), killing the most students in the class making him the largest threat. It is later mentioned he had been in a car crash at a young age (where he witnessed his mother's death), causing brain damage and resulting in a lack of emotions and regret.
  is the secondary antagonist, considered one of the most beautiful girls in the program, she is also the most deranged, and the female with the most kills, succeeding in using her feminine wiles and ability to feign emotions to manipulate then kill her classmates. It is later revealed that these psychological issues stem from her father leaving after her parents divorced, and the subsequent sexual abuse she received from her new stepfather as well as physical abuse from her own mother.

Development

Writing style
At first the creators of the original version of the "Battle Royale" manga kept the story close to the original Japanese novel. As publication increased, Taguchi took increasing liberties with the story. Takami said that he looked forward to new installments of Taguchi's story and Taguchi said that he more strongly cared about the characters. Takami liked how Taguchi distributed the time among characters; Takami said that in the manga the characters changed and grew as the story progressed, unlike in the original novel. Taguchi said that in the manga version he modeled most of Takami's characters after people he personally knew. Takami describes Taguchi's stance as closer to his own than the stance of Kinji Fukasaku, the director of the film. Takami describes the manga as containing the feeling of "a general, nonjudgmental love for humans."

Art style
Taguchi said that many people describe his art style as "reminiscent of "gekiga", or that it's realistic." Taguchi disagrees with the descriptions, instead characterizing faces in his works as "manga faces" since he feels that it is "really easy to put my own emotions into the faces." Taguchi said that when he shows sadness in characters, he locates the characters' eyebrows "down as far as possible." Takami describes Taguchi's art as "directly descended from Osamu Tezuka" and "manga-esque." Takami described the style as "easy to overlook" because the art contains "clean lines." Takami believed that the art style fit the Battle Royale story. In the beginning Taguchi said that he felt that all of the characters had to "look like middle school students." Taguchi said that as the story progressed for many of the characters he began to draw them "more naturally" and add "specific expressions for certain things they would say." Takami describes the newer style as "more grown-up looking."

English-language adaptation
An English-language release of the collected volumes, published in the United States, Canada, and United Kingdom by Tokyopop was extensively rewritten by Keith Giffen, whose script does not completely follow the original manga.

Their adaptation mentions several dates that change the time the story is set in by almost 10 years. It uses the line "in the near future", but on Shogo Kawada's profile, it references the 2005 "program"; he says his last program was a year ago, leading to the assumption that the manga sets the story in 2006. In volume one of the English-language version, Shinji Mimura and the news channel reporter mentions the 2007 record of three days, seven hours and twenty-two minutes. In volume 14, Kamon refers to the 2009 program. None of these dates are mentioned in the original Japanese version.

But the major difference between the Japanese and Tokyopop version is that Giffen rewrote the BR program as a Reality TV show, rather than keeping it in tune with the BR Act, which leaves plot-holes through the manga, especially in volume 15. This can be partially attributed to the fact that when Tokyopop had released volume 1, the Japanese version was only up to volume 9 at that point, thereby not giving Tokyopop or Giffen ample material to prove that their rewrite would backfire.

According to Tokyopop editor Mark Paniccia, in the Newsarama article: 'For adapting the work, Giffen was given a tight Japanese-to-English translation of the story, but his assignment was by no means just to tweak a translation. "I told him to do what he felt he had to do", Paniccia said. "I told him to Giffenize it."'

To which Giffen responds: '"It's a good story that Takami is telling", Giffen said. "What I do is go in and make bad scenes that much worse. I loved the movie of Battle Royale, and also love the manga. I just wanted to do it right. I wanted to do justice to it, and I knew I couldn't get away with doing a straight translation, because it would be horrifyingly bad."'

In April 2006, Tim Beedle, a former associate editor of the English version Battle Royale, stated on the Tokyopop Messageboard the reasoning behind the decision to have a fairly loose adaptation:'Prior to starting work on the first volume of Battle Royale, its editor (Mark Paniccia, who has since left Tokyopop) made a decision to hire Keith Giffen, a well-known American comic book writer, to provide a much looser adaptation than usual. He made this decision for a variety of reasons, but two seemed to be more prominent than the rest. First, due to BR's extreme content and M rating, it was going to be a tough sell. (Some of the large chains refuse to carry M-rated books.) Hiring a known writer could help compensate for this by driving sales. Second, more than any other book we were publishing at the time, BR had the potential to find a crossover audience in the direct market among American comic book readers, who often are adverse to trying manga.'

The plot changes to turn the BR Program into a Reality Show sponsored by the Government held similarities to Suzanne Collins' 2008 novel The Hunger Games. John Green pointed out that the premise of the novel is "nearly identical". Although Collins maintains that she "had never heard of that book until [her] book was turned in," The New York Times reports that "the parallels are striking enough that Collins's work has been savaged on the blogosphere as a baldfaced ripoff," but that "there are enough possible sources for the plot line that the two authors might well have hit on the same basic setup independently."

Tokyopop released an "Ultimate Edition" of Battle Royale which consisted of 5 omnibus novels, with each novel having over 600 pages. The first volume was released on December 15, 2007, and the fifth and last on February 10, 2009. The Ultimate Edition has bonus features that consist of color pages, character sketches, weapon details, and Q&A's with the author, Koushun Takami.

Other adaptations
Conrad Editora from Brazil began publishing a Portuguese version at the tail end of 2006. It follows the original 15-volume format, and does not adapt the Giffen "Reality Show" version (although the cover of the first edition mentions the reality show). It was cancelled after 12 volumes in 2007, but returned in 2011. Editorial Ivrea from Argentina published a Spanish version.

Chapters
The following titles reflect the English-language version.

Battle Royale II: Blitz Royale
 was inspired by the film Battle Royale II: Requiem. While the author of the original novel, Koushun Takami, is given the "original work" credit, the story and art are by Hitoshi Tomizawa.

Like the earlier Battle Royales, a class of middle school students are picked to compete in fights to the death on an island until there is only one left.

The manga follows the point of view of Girl #10 Makoto Hashimoto (橋本真恋人 Hashimoto Makoto), an unlucky girl who fears that her class will be chosen to participate in "the program," a mysterious event that forces students to kill each other. Makoto attends Shikanotoride Junior High School.

After the encouragement of her best friend Itou Yamamoto and her mother she decides to face the chances. Her fears are supposedly put to rest when word spreads that all 50 Programs had already been executed in the year making them 100% unlikely to participate. Arriving at their field trip in one piece, Makoto begins to forward all her nervousness into getting a boy she likes: Nomura.

As the field trip kicks off, and the girls sneak into one of the boys' rooms, specifically Nomura's. While Itou takes advantage of the smuggled Vodka Nomura breaks the ice between himself and Makoto by asking her out, however, their romance is cut short when a boy runs in alerting the presence of their teacher. The girls hide inside the sleeping bags of the other boys which Nomura takes the chance of to feel Makoto's breast. Right when they believe the coast is clear, they are assaulted by a group of Navy soldiers who begin to forcefully push the students around which involves Nomura getting the end of a gun smashed in his face.

The students are all held captive by the government, and brought to a room where a man in a military uniform, Hoshou Takagi, stands to address the students of the new Navy Exclusive version of the Program. While the students are recovering from the sudden announcement, the intoxicated Itou is grabbed by the hair and has her long locks forcefully shaved off. As Makoto rushes to her friends side she meets the end of a gun, and her father's talisman is ripped from her neck.

From this point the story becomes much darker, the students are sent to a non-aggressive defence school and forced to dispose of corpses. They are then gassed in a shower chamber, dressed in full military attire (complete with collar).

When given the chance to rebel against the government, Makoto declines causing Nomura to become aggravated calling her "Chicken Shit". However, when Boy #3 Mitsugu Kawasaki gets the same opportunity, he takes it but as he turns his gun to the soldier he becomes the first victim of the new program and has his collar detonated before all his classmates, killing him.

It is later revealed that Mitsugu is the brother of the winner from the first Battle Royale.

The volume ends with Makoto as the solo female survivor and solemnly swearing that she will not let another class experience what she and her class went through while watching another new generation of teenagers arrive on the island, implying that a new Program is about to begin.

Volume list

Battle Royale: Angels' Border
Battle Royale: Angels' Border is written by Koushun Takami and illustrated by Mioko Ohnishi and Youhei Oguma (each drawing one chapter). Set within the continuity of the original Battle Royale novel, it contains two side stories about the girls that hole up in the lighthouse. The first episode follows the point of view of Haruka Tanizawa. The second one is devoted to Chisato Matsui and Shinji Mimura. It was published in Young Champion in 2011, and later combined into one tankōbon volume on January 20, 2012. The single volume was published in North America by Viz Media on June 17, 2014.

In the first episode, Haruka reveals through narration that she had recently realized that she is a lesbian and has romantic feelings for her best friend, Yukie Utsumi. However, she did not have a chance to come out before her class was pulled into the Program, and she struggles with her feelings while she, Yukie, and the others are hiding in the lighthouse. She wants to be close to Yukie, but at the same time knows that Yukie has a crush on Shuya Nanahara, whom the girls rescue after his near-fatal escape from Kazuo Kiriyama. Haruka also admires Yukie for her leadership, as her friend keeps the group together by reminding them that they all share their hope.

Each chapter of the episode concludes with a flash-forward to the events that lead the girls to turn on each other and the tragedy that results. The episode concludes with the injured Haruka's final act of fatally wounding Satomi Noda, who had killed Chisato and Yukie. Haruka dies when Satomi returns fire a final time before crumpling dead on the floor.

The second episode is primarily told in a flashback to the previous school year. Chisato has a chance encounter with Shinji on the train back to Shiroiwa, and after an incident with a surly passenger, the two hop off the train early and spend time together. Shinji takes Chisato on an impromptu date, and the two get to know one another. However, they come to a shared realization that they should not associate too closely with one another. Shinji's uncle was killed by agents of the government for engaging in anti-government activities, and Chisato's older brother, while suspected and subsequently cleared of the same, committed suicide. Because of these family ties, Shinji and Chisato speculate that the authorities may accuse them of conspiring against the government if they spend too much time together, and so they keep apart while maintaining strong places in their hearts for each other.

Like the first episode, each chapter of the second episode concludes with events that lead to the deaths of Shinji and Chisato. The ending also provides an explanation for why Chisato steps toward the gun on the table when Satomi threatens her and the others; an act that went without explanation or elaboration in the novel. Chisato's intent is to take the gun and throw it out of a window in order to show Satomi that she is not a threat. Only after it is too late does Chisato realize her mistake; Satomi reads Chisato's movement as aggressive, and kills her. As Chisato dies, she apologizes to Shinji for her failure.

Legacy
According to its director, Hwang Dong-hyuk, the 2021 South Korean television show Squid Game was influenced by the manga version of Battle Royale.

See also

 List of comics based on fiction
 Squid Game

References

External links
 Tokyopop Battle Royale page
 

2000 manga
2003 manga
Akita Shoten manga
Anime and manga controversies
Battle royale anime and manga
Science fiction anime and manga
Seinen manga
Thriller anime and manga
Tokyopop titles
Viz Media manga